Weißenbach an der Enns is a former municipality in the district of Liezen in the Austrian state of Styria. Since the 2015 Styria municipal structural reform, it is part of the municipality Sankt Gallen.

Population

References

Cities and towns in Liezen District